The 2016 Lucas Oil 150 was the 22nd stock car race of the 2016 NASCAR Camping World Truck Series, the final race of the Round of 6, and the 22nd iteration of the event. The race was held on Friday, November 11, 2016, in Avondale, Arizona, at Phoenix International Raceway, a 1-mile (1.6 km) permanent tri-oval shaped racetrack. The race took the scheduled 150 laps to complete. Daniel Suárez, driving for Kyle Busch Motorsports, held off Johnny Sauter on the final restart with 4 laps to go, and earned his 1st career NASCAR Camping World Truck Series win. William Byron dominated the majority of the race, leading 112 laps before blowing an engine on lap 141. To fill out the podium, Matt Crafton, driving for ThorSport Racing, would finish in 3rd, respectively.

The four drivers that advanced into the championship 4 are Johnny Sauter, Matt Crafton, Christopher Bell, and Timothy Peters. William Byron and Ben Kennedy would be eliminated from championship contention.

Background 

Phoenix International Raceway is a 1-mile, low-banked tri-oval race track located in Avondale, Arizona, near Phoenix. The motorsport track opened in 1964 and currently hosts two NASCAR race weekends annually including the final championship race since 2020. Phoenix Raceway has also hosted the CART, IndyCar Series, USAC and the WeatherTech SportsCar Championship. The raceway is currently owned and operated by NASCAR.

Phoenix Raceway is home to two annual NASCAR race weekends, one of 13 facilities on the NASCAR schedule to host more than one race weekend a year. It first joined the NASCAR Cup Series schedule in 1988 as a late season event, and in 2005 the track was given a spring date. The now-NASCAR Camping World Truck Series was added in 1995 and the now-NASCAR Xfinity Series began running there in 1999.

Entry list 

 (R) denotes rookie driver.
 (i) denotes driver who is ineligible for series driver points.

Practice

First practice 
The first practice session was held on Friday, November 11, at 9:30 am MST, and would last for 55 minutes.

Final practice 
The final practice session was held on Friday, November 11, at 1:00 pm MST, and would last for 50 minutes.

Qualifying 
Qualifying was held on Friday, November 11, at 6:30 pm MST. Since Phoenix International Raceway is under 1.5 miles (2.4 km) in length, the qualifying system is a multi-car system that included three rounds. The first round was 15 minutes, where every driver would be able to set a lap within the 15 minutes. Then, the second round would consist of the fastest 24 cars in Round 1, and drivers would have 10 minutes to set a lap. Round 3 consisted of the fastest 12 drivers from Round 2, and the drivers would have 5 minutes to set a time. Whoever was fastest in Round 3 would win the pole. 

Tommy Regan would fail to qualify.

Full qualifying results

Race results

Standings after the race 

Drivers' Championship standings

Note: Only the first 8 positions are included for the driver standings.

References 

NASCAR races at Phoenix Raceway
November 2016 sports events in the United States
2016 in sports in Arizona